Gomishan (also Romanized as Gomīshān and Gumshān; formerly, Gomish Tepe, also Romanized as Gomesh Tappeh, Gomīsh Tappeh, and Gumish Tepe; also formerly known as Gomish Tepe Jik, also Romanized as Gomīsh Tappeh Jīk) is a city and capital of Gomishan County, Golestan Province, Iran. At the 2006 census its population was 15,639, in 3,236 families.

The city's Turkmen name, Kümüş depe, means "Silver Hill".

References 

Populated places in Torkaman County
Cities in Golestan Province